Bruce Edmund Headley (14 February 1934 – 15 January 2021) was a Thoroughbred horse trainer and owner.

Biography
Involved with horse racing since his teens, Headley worked as an exercise rider from 1949 until taking out his trainers license in 1959. Based in California, he first gained national attention with Bertrando who won the 1991 Norfolk Stakes by a record nine lengths and went on to a second-place finish behind a brilliant performance by European star, Arazi. Headley's greatest success to date came with the Champion sprint horse Kona Gold, a winner of multiple stakes races including the 2000 Breeders' Cup Sprint. In addition to being the horse's trainer, Headley was also a one-third partner. He co-owned Kona Gold with Irwin Molasky.

In 2003, Headley trained Got Koko, owned by his wife Aase in partnership with Paul Leung. The filly was just the third-ever winner of the La Cañada Series at Santa Anita Park since its inception in 1975. The three-race series consists of the La Brea, El Encino and La Cañada Stakes for newly turning/turned 4-year old fillies run at an increasing distance.

Death
Headley died on 15 January 2021 at the age of 86 years.

References

External links
 Bruce Headley at the NTRA
 Bruce Headleys profile at Santa Anita Park

1934 births
2021 deaths
People from Baldwin Park, California
American horse trainers
Sportspeople from California